Yanling County is a county in the central part of Henan province, China. It is the easternmost county-level division of the prefecture-level city of Xuchang.

History

Human habitation of the area began around 6000 BC.

In the early Zhou Dynasty, the area became the state of Yan.

In the Eastern Zhou Dynasty, the area became known as Yan Yi after the destruction of the state of Yan under Duke Wu of Zheng in the early part of the reign of King Ping of Zhou (after 770 BC).

In the fifth month of 722 BC, Duke Zhuang of Zheng defeated his younger brother Gongshu Duan north of present-day Yanling County.

The famous Battle of Yanling (575 BC) took place in Yanling County.

Yanling County was established during the Western Han dynasty in the year 201 BC.

In 2014, six men in Yanling County were fined 2,000 yuan each for their roles in catching 1,689 wild geckos in Zhangqiao.

Administrative divisions
The county is made up of twelve towns:

Towns:

Climate

Economy
The county's primary agricultural products include wheat, beans, sweet potatoes, cotton and tobacco among others. The county is known for growing flowers which began during the Tang Dynasty and flourished during the Song Dynasty. The county is therefore known as 'Flower County' (or also  and ). Industries in the county include machinery manufacturing, fertilizer, concrete and wine making among others.

In 2017, the value of the county's output in the flower and plant industry reached 7.1 billion yuan (1.03 billion U.S. dollars).

Demographics

The population of the county decreased between the 2000 Census and 2010 Census.

Transportation
 China National Highway 311

References

Further reading
 鄢陵志 - 嘉靖十六年 (1537) ('Yanling Annals - Sixteenth Year of the Jiajing Emperor (1537)') 
 鄢陵縣志 - 順治十六年 (1659) ('Yanling County Annals - Sixteenth Year of the Shunzhi Emperor (1659)') 
 鄢陵縣志 - 道光十三年 (1833) ('Yanling County Annals - Thirteenth Year of the Daoguang Emperor (1833)') 
 鄢陵文獻志 - 同治四年 (1865) ('Yanling County Documents & Annals - Fourth Year of the Tongzhi Emperor (1865)') 
 鄢陵縣志 - 民國二十五年 (1936) ('Yanling County Annals - Twenty-fifth Year of the Republic (1936)')

External links
 《生財有道》河南鄢陵：花木興 百業興 20190925 CCTV財經 ('Shengcai Youdao - Henan Yanling: Flowers in Bloom, Strong Economy 25 Sept 2019 CCTV-2') 

County-level divisions of Henan
Xuchang